The following people spent time at the University of London as either teaching staff or students. In 2015 there were a total of around 2 million University of London alumni across the world.

Until year 2008, all colleges within the federal collegiate system, solely awarded University of London degree. From 2003 onwards some colleges received their own degree-awarding powers. However, these were held in abeyance until 2008, when a number of colleges began to award their own degrees.

Nobel Laureates
There are a total of 84 Nobel Laureates who were either students or staff members at the University of London. Their respective college or colleges is shown in the parenthesis. The following table shows the number of Nobel Laureates from each college:

There are also many non-formal graduates of the University of London who have been awarded honorary degrees and doctorates to Nobel Laureates. Notable names include Amartya Sen (Hon. DSc), Shirin Ebadi (Hon. LLD), George Akerlof (Hon. DSc), Robert Mundell (Hon. DSc), Muhammad Yunus (Hon. DSc)

Politicians and Heads of State

Monarchs and Royalty
 Tuanku Jaafar – King of Malaysia, 1994–1999 (LSE)
 Letsie III of Lesotho – King of Lesotho
 Margrethe II of Denmark – Queen of Denmark, 1972–present (LSE)
 Sultan Salahuddin – King of Malaysia 1999–2001 (SOAS)
 Princess Beatrice of York - Member of British royal family (Goldsmiths)
 Princess Laurentien - Wife of Prince Constantijn (QMUL)
 Napoléon, Prince Imperial – son of Emperor Napoleon III (KCL)
 Haakon Magnus – Crown Prince of Norway (LSE)
 Mette-Marit – Crown Princess of Norway (SOAS)
 Abdulaziz bin Turki al Faisal – Grandson of King Faisal of Saudi Arabia (SOAS)
 Prince Prisdang – member of the Thai royal family (KCL)
 Camilla, Queen consort of the United Kingdom and other Commonwealth realms. (ULIP)

Presidents and prime ministers
 Hossein Ala' – Prime Minister of Iran
 A.N.R. Robinson – Prime Minister of Trinidad and Tobago, 1986–1981, and President of Trinidad and Tobago, 1997–2003
 Natalia Gherman – Acting Prime Minister of Moldova, 2015 (KCL)
 Harmodio Arias – President of Panama, 1932–1936 (LSE)
 Óscar Arias – President of Costa Rica, 1986–1990, 2006–Present (LSE)
 Marouf al-Bakhit – Prime Minister of Jordan, 2005–2007 (KCL)
 Errol Walton Barrow – Prime Minister of Barbados, 1962–1966, 1966–1976, 1986–1987 (LSE)
 Sükhbaataryn Batbold – Prime Minister of Mongolia, 2009–present (LBS)
 Abd ar-Rahman al-Bazzaz – Prime Minister of Iraq, 1965–1966 (KCL)
 Marek Belka – Prime Minister of Poland, 2004–2005 (LSE)
 Godfrey Binaisa – President of Uganda, 1979–1980 (KCL)
 Heinrich Brüning – Chancellor of Germany, 1930–1932 (LSE)
 Kim Campbell – Prime Minister of Canada, June–November 1993 (LSE)
 Eugenia Charles – Prime Minister of Dominica, 1980–1995 (LSE)
 Ellis Clarke – Prime Minister of Trinidad and Tobago, 1976–1987 (UCL)
 John Compton – Premier of Saint Lucia, 1964–1979, and Prime Minister of Saint Lucia, February–July 1979 & 1982–1996 (LSE)
 Sher Bahadur Deuba – Prime Minister of Nepal, 1995–1997, 2001–2002, 2004–2005 (LSE)
 Luisa Diogo – Prime Minister of Mozambique, 1991–1992 (SOAS)
 Bülent Ecevit – former Prime Minister of Turkey (SOAS)
 Robert Fico – current Prime Minister of Slovakia (UCL)
 Rajiv Gandhi – Prime Minister of India 1984–1989 (ICL)
 Chaim Herzog – President of Israel 1983–1993 (UCL)
 Hirobumi Ito – Prime Minister of Japan, 1885–1888, 1892–1896, 1898, 1900–1901 (UCL)
 Guðni Th. Jóhannesson – Icelandic politician; President of Iceland (2016-) (QMUL)
 John F. Kennedy – President of the United States of America 1961–1963 (LSE)
 Jomo Kenyatta – first President of Kenya, 1964–1978 (LSE)
 Mwai Kibaki – President of Kenya, 2002–present (LSE)
 Glafcos Klerides – President of Cyprus, 1993–2003 (KCL)
 Junichiro Koizumi – Prime Minister of Japan, 2001–2006 ( UCL)
 Thanin Kraivichien – Prime Minister of Thailand, 1976–1977 (LSE)
 Yu Kuo-Hwa – Premier of Taiwan, 1984–1989 (LSE)
 Hilla Limann – President of Ghana, 1979–1981 (LSE)
 Alfonso López Pumarejo – President of Colombia, 1934–1938, 1942–1945 (LSE)
 Ramsay MacDonald – Prime Minister of the United Kingdom, 1924, 1929–1935 (BBK)
 Michael Manley – Prime Minister of Jamaica, 1972–1980, 1989–1992 (LSE)
 Kamisese Mara – Prime Minister of Fiji 1970–1992, President of Fiji 1994–2000 (LSE)
 Ahmed Mohamed Mohamoud – President of Somaliland (LSE)
 Sir Lee Moore – Prime Minister of Saint Kitts and Nevis, 1979–1980 (KCL)
 Robert Mugabe – President of Zimbabwe (ULIP)
 Kocheril Raman Narayanan – President of India, 1997–2002 (LSE)
 Kwame Nkrumah – President of Ghana, 1960–1966 (LSE)
 Basdeo Panday – Prime Minister of Trinidad and Tobago, 1995–2001
 Tassos Papadopoulos – President of Cyprus, 2003–2008 (KCL)
 Percival Patterson – Prime Minister of Jamaica, 1992–2006 (LSE)
 Sir Lynden Pindling – Prime Minister of the Bahamas, 1969–1992 (KCL)
 Romano Prodi – Prime Minister of Italy, 1996–1998, 2006–present, President of the European Commission, 1999–2004 (LSE)
 Navinchandra Ramgoolam – Prime Minister of Mauritius, 1995–2000 (LSE)
 France-Albert René – Prime Minister of Seychelles 1976–1977, and President of Seychelles 1977–2004 (KCL)
 Sir Veerasamy Ringadoo – first President of Mauritius, March–June 1992 (LSE)
 Moshe Sharett – Prime Minister of Israel, 1953–1955 (LSE)
 Constantine Simitis – Prime Minister of Greece, 1996–2004 (LSE)
 Anote Tong – President of Kiribati, 2003–present (LSE)
 Pierre Trudeau – Prime Minister of Canada, 1968–1979, 1980–1984 (LSE)
 Aung San Suu Kyi – incumbent State Counsellor of Myanmar
 Htin Kyaw – 9th and incumbent President of Myanmar

Other prominent political figures
Santu Shahaney IOFS officer. He served as the first Indian Director General of the Indian Ordnance Factories
 Masidi Manjun - State Minister of Local Government and Housing. Sabah, Malaysia
 V. K. Krishna Menon - 3rd Defence Minister of India (UCL, LSE)
 Achim Steiner - Administrator of the United Nations Development Programme
 Kemal Derviş - Administrator of the United Nations Development Programme (2005 to 2009)
 David Nabarro - Special Adviser to the United Nations Secretary-General on the 2030 Agenda for Sustainable Development and Climate Change
 Nitin Desai - United Nations Under-Secretary-General for Economic and Social Affairs (1992 to 2003)
 Jamal Benomar - United Nations Under-Secretary-General
 Mark Lowcock - United Nations Under-Secretary-General for Humanitarian Affairs and Emergency Relief Coordinator
 John Hocking - United Nations Assistant Secretary-General
 Julian Harston - United Nations Assistant Secretary-General
 Elliott Abrams – American politician (LSE)
 Christopher Addison, 1st Viscount Addison – British minister (QMUL)
 B. R. Ambedkar – architect of the Indian Constitution, Indian independence leader, minister and anti-caste system activist (LSE)
 Obed Asamoah – Ghanaian Foreign Minister (KCL)
 Ziad Bahaa-Eldin – Deputy Prime Minister of Egypt (KCL)
 Cherie Booth – wife of British Prime Minister Tony Blair (LSE)
 Martin Bourke – Governor of The Turks and Caicos Islands (KCL)
 Ed Broadbent – Canadian political leader (LSE)
 Dame Lois Browne-Evans – Bermudian opposition leader (KCL)
 Rudranath Capildeo – Leader of the Opposition of the Commonwealth of Trinidad and Tobago
 Maragatham Chandrasekhar – Indian Cabinet Minister (KCL)
 Michael Collins – Irish independence leader (KCL)
 Sir John Cockburn – Premier of South Australia
 Abdulai Conteh – Vice President of Sierra Leone (KCL)
 Sir Stafford Cripps – former Chancellor of the Exchequer (UCL)
 David Currie, Baron Currie of Marylebone – British politician, member of the House of Lords (QMUL)
 Edwina Currie – British minister (LSE)
 Hugh Dalton – Chancellor of the Exchequer (LSE)
 Joseph B. Dauda – Sierra Leonean Finance Minister (KCL)
 Kemal Derviş – Turkish politician and senior UN administrator
 Frank Dobson – British minister (LSE)
 Marlene Malahoo Forte – Jamaican Foreign Minister (KCL)
 Natalia Gherman – Deputy Prime Minister of Moldova (KCL)
 Mahatma Gandhi – Indian Independence Leader (UCL)
 Marc Grossman – American Under Secretary of State
 Sir Sydney Gun-Munro – Governor-General of Saint Vincent and the Grenadines (KCL)
 Peter Hain, Baron Hain – British minister and anti-apartheid campaigner (QMUL)
 Peter Hennessy, Baron Hennessy of Nympsfield  – British politician, member of the House of Lords (QMUL)
 Farrer Herschell, 1st Baron Herschell – Lord Chancellor (UCL)
 Ajay Kakkar, Baron Kakkar – British surgeon, Professor of Surgery at University College London, member of the House of Lords (QMUL)
 Ruth Kelly – British minister (LSE)
 Horace Maybray King, Baron Maybray-King – Speaker of the House of Commons (KCL)
 Ibrahim Jazi -  Jordanian Minister of State for Prime Ministry Affairs
 Tessa Jowell – British minister (GCUL)
 William Joyce – wartime propagandist (BBK)
 Muhammad Zafrulla Khan – Pakistani Foreign Minister (KCL)
 Robert F. Kennedy Jr. – son of U.S. Senator Robert F. Kennedy, nephew of LSE graduate President John F. Kennedy, and environmental activist (LSE)
 David Lammy – British minister (SOAS)
 Emily Lau – Hong Kong political leader (LSE)
 Ambrose Lau – Hong Kong political leader
 William Hare, 5th Earl of Listowel – Governor General of Ghana (KCL)
 James Lowther, 1st Viscount Ullswater – Speaker of the House of Commons (KCL)
 John MacGregor, Baron MacGregor of Pulham Market – Leader of the House of Commons (KCL)
 Ann Dore McLaughlin – U.S. Secretary of Labor
 Anne McLellan – Deputy Prime Minister of Canada (KCL)
 Ken Michael – governor of Western Australia (ICL)
 Alfred Milner, 1st Viscount Milner – British Cabinet Minister (KCL)
 Francis Minah – Vice President of Sierra Leone (KCL)
 Nickolay Mladenov – Bulgarian Foreign Minister (KCL)
 James Nyamweya – Kenyan Foreign Minister (KCL)
 David Owen, Baron Owen of Plymouth – British Foreign Secretary (KCL)
 Alice Paul – American suffragist (LSE)
 Jacques Parizeau – Premier of Quebec (LSE)
 Richard Perle – American political advisor (LSE)
 Enoch Powell – British minister and right-wing politician (SOAS)
 S. Rajaratnam – Deputy Prime Minister of Singapore and Cabinet minister (KCL)
 Sir Shridath Ramphal – Commonwealth Secretary-General and Guyanese Foreign Minister (KCL)
 Paul Robeson – American athlete, actor, singer and civil rights activist (SOAS)
 Walter Rodney – Guyanese activist (SOAS)
 Robert Rubin – U.S. Treasury Secretary
 Sir Ernest Satow – British diplomat (UCL)
 Stephen Smith – Australian politician
 Robert Sobukwe – South African political dissident
 Marie Stopes – family planning and eugenics campaigner (UCL)
 Gisela Stuart – Member of Parliament, England (Birmingham Edgbaston) (ULIP)
 Goh Keng Swee – deputy Prime Minister of Singapore (LSE)
 Hayashi Tadasu – Japanese Foreign Minister (KCL)
 Teo Chee Hean – Singaporean minister (ICL)
 Harold Watkinson, 1st Viscount Watkinson – Minister of Defence (KCL)
 David Welch – American Assistant Secretary of State
 Frederick Wills – Guyanese Foreign Minister (KCL)
 David Wilson – Governor of Hong Kong
 Lord Woolf – Chief Justice of England and Wales (UCL)
 Abdi Yusuf Hassan – Somali politician and diplomat
 Rais Yatim – Malaysian Foreign Minister (KCL)
 Winston Set Aung – politician, economist and management consultant, incumbent Deputy Governor of the Central Bank of Myanmar
 Rafiq Zakaria – Indian politician
 Ahmad Ziadat, Jordanian Minister of Justice
 Tom Wolf – Governor of Pennsylvania
 Grace Mugabe - Former First Lady of Zimbabwe & Spouse to Robert Mugabe.
Ferdinand Alexander “Sandro” Araneta Marcos III - Member of the Philippine House of Representatives, eldest son of President Bongbong Marcos and First Lady Liza Araneta-Marcos. (CITY)

Armed Forces and Military
 Ernst Boepple (1887–1950), German Nazi official and SS officer executed for war crimes
 John Harding, 1st Baron Harding of Petherton – Field Marshal and Chief of the Imperial General Staff (KCL)
 Jonathon Riley - Lieutenant-General in the British Army (UCL)
 Ben Key - Vice Admiral in the Royal Navy (Royal Holloway)
 Syed Ata Hasnain - Lieutenant General in the Indian Army (KCL)
 Richard Nugee - Lieutenant General in the British Army (KCL)
 Robert Fry - Lieutenant General in the Royal Marines (KCL)
 Julian Thompson - Major General in the Royal Marines (KCL)
 Richard Nugee - Lieutenant General in the British Army and Deputy Chief of the Defence Staff (People) (KCL)
 James Fitzgerald Martin - Major General in the British Army
 Emmanuel Karenzi Karake - Lieutenant General in Rwandan Defence Forces

Clergy and Religious Figures

 Berhaneyesus Demerew Souraphiel – Catholic cardinal and Archbishop of Addis Abeba
 Mirza Tahir Ahmad – Khalifatul Masih IV, Caliph(Imam)IV of the Ahmadiyya Muslim Community
 Alan Campbell – controversial Pentecostal pastor
 George Carey, Baron Carey of Clifton – Archbishop of Canterbury (KCL)
 Robert William Dale – Nonconformist church leader
 Mark Elvins – Capuchin friar (HEY)
 Philip Edgecumbe Hughes – New Testament scholar, Professor at Westminster Theological Seminary
 Bernard Lonergan – theologian, philosopher and economist (HEY)
 Michael Anthony Moxon – Dean of Truro Cathedral (HEY)
 John Anthony McGuckin – Orthodox priest and poet (HEY)
 Njongonkulu Ndungane – Archbishop of Cape Town (KCL)
 Keith Riglin – Bishop of Argyll and The Isles (HEY) (KCL)
 Sir Jonathan Sacks – Chief Rabbi of the United Kingdom and the Commonwealth (KCL)
 Lindsay Urwin – Bishop of Horsham (HEY)
 Oliver D. Crisp (KCL)

Other religious figures
 Heidi Baker – Christian missionary (KCL)
 Muhammad Abdul Bari – Secretary General of the Muslim Council of Britain (KCL)
 Shaw Clifton – General of The Salvation Army (KCL)
 Francis Lyon Cohen - rabbi and Army chaplain (KCL)
 Richard Coles – priest, musician and journalist (KCL)
 Leonard Coulshaw – Chaplain of the Fleet (KCL)
 Frank Curtis – Provost of Sheffield (KCL)
 Thomas Pelham Dale – Ritualist clergyman (KCL)
 Rob Frost – Methodist evangelist (KCL)
 Robert Gandell – biblical scholar (KCL)
 Donald Clifford Gray – clergyman (KCL)
 Walter Homolka – rabbi (KCL)
 Donald Howard – Provost of St Andrew's Cathedral, Aberdeen (KCL)
 Lawrence Jackson – Provost of Blackburn (KCL)
 Eric James – Chaplain Extraordinary to HM the Queen (KCL)
 George Jack Kinnell – Provost of St Andrew's Cathedral, Aberdeen (KCL)
 Kenneth Leech – priest (KCL)
 Peter Mallett – Chaplain-General to the Forces (KCL)
 Michael Nott – Provost of Portsmouth (KCL)
 Hugh Smith – Chaplain-General of Prisons (KCL)
 Frederick Spurrell – priest and archaeologist (KCL)

Nobel Peace Prize
 Óscar Arias (LSE)
 Ralph Bunche (LSE)
 Nelson Mandela (ULIP)
 Philip Noel-Baker (LSE)
 Aung San Suu Kyi (SOAS)
 Joseph Rotblat (QMUL)
 Archbishop Desmond Tutu (KCL)

Nobel Prize for Literature
 Bertrand Russell (LSE)
 George Bernard Shaw (LSE)
 Rabindranath Tagore (UCL)
 T. S. Eliot (BBK)
 Harold Pinter (CSSD)
 Wole Soyinka (ULIP)
 Derek Walcott (ULIP)
 Mario Vargas Llosa (KCL/QMUL)

Scientists and Mathematicians

Biologists and Botanists
 David Bellamy (KCL & RHUL)
 Qui-Lim Choo - co-discoverer of Hepatitis C and of the Hepatitis D genome (KCL)
 Soraya Dhillon MBE - pharmacologist (KCL)
 Michael Houghton - co-discoverer of Hepatitis C and of the Hepatitis D genome (KCL)
 Keith Campbell - led team that cloned Dolly the sheep (KCL)
 W.D. Hamilton (LSE)
 Thomas Henry Huxley (ICL)
 Richard Owen (QMUL)
 Robert Swinhoe
 Katherine Warington (RHUL)

Chemists
 Sir Derek Harold Richard Barton (ICL & BBK)
 Michael Barnett (KCL)
 William Boon (KCL)
 John Eddowes Bowman the Younger (KCL)
 Sir John Cadogan (KCL)
 Sir Arthur Herbert Church (KCL)
 G Marius Clore (UCL)
 Leslie Crombie (KCL)
 Sir William Crookes (ICL)
 Charles Frederick Cross (KCL)
 John Frederic Daniell (KCL)
 Richard Dixon (KCL)
 Sir Arthur Duckham - President of the Institution of Chemical Engineers
 Sir Edward Frankland (QMUL & ICL)
 Rosalind Franklin (KCL & BBK)
 Victor Gold (KCL)
 Leticia González (KCL)
 Otto Hahn (UCL)
 Sir Walter Haworth (ICL)
 Jaroslav Heyrovský (UCL)
 Sir Graham Hills (BBK)
 August Wilhelm von Hofmann (ICL)
 Sir Cyril Hinshelwood (ICL)
 Sir Herbert Jackson (KCL)
 Sir Aaron Klug (BBK)
 Michael Levitt (KCL)
 Nick Lane (UCL)
 Catherine Nobes (UCL)
 Augustine Ong (KCL)
 Geoffrey Ozin (KCL)
 Arthur Thomas Palin, pioneer in water quality testing
 Sir William Henry Perkin (ICL)
 William Henry Perkin, Jr. (ICL)
 Raymond Peters (KCL)
 Sir George Porter (ICL/UCL)
 Juda Hirsch Quastel (ICL)
 Sir William Ramsay (UCL)
 Sir Robert Robinson (UCL)
 Eric Scerri (KCL)
 Sir Frederick Soddy (UCL)
 Richard Laurence Millington Synge  (LI)
 Sir Jocelyn Field Thorpe (KCL)
 Alexander Robertus Todd (LI)
 Matthew H. Todd (QMUL & UCL)
 Vincent du Vigneaud (UCL)
 Sir Geoffrey Wilkinson (ICL)
 Rob Williams

Computer Scientists
 Steve Bourne (KCL)
 Ian H. S. Cullimore (KCL)
 Darren Dalcher (KCL)
 Dora Metcalf (KCL)
 Hassan Ugail (KCL)

Engineers and Inventors
 Sir William Anderson (KCL)
 Rutherford Aris
 Ayodele Awojobi (ICL)
 Richard Beeching, Baron Beeching (ICL)
 Alexander Graham Bell (UCL)
 Henry Brogden (KCL)
 Henry Marc Brunel (KCL)
 William Clark (KCL)
 Donald Watts Davies (ICL)
 Henry Deane (KCL)
 James H. Ellis (ICL)
 Tommy Flowers
 Sir Douglas Fox (KCL)
 Sir Stanley Hooker (ICL)
 Sir Alec Issigonis (ULIP)
 Walter Katte (KCL)
 Frederick William Lanchester (ICL)
 Sir William Henry Preece (KCL)
 Alec Reeves (ICL)
 Bill Strang (KCL)
 Thomas Walker (KCL)
 Sir Charles Wheatstone (KCL)
 Mark Whitby (KCL)
 Sir John Wolfe-Barry (KCL)

Geologists, Environmental Scientists and Physical Geographers
 George Barrow (KCL)
 Henry William Bristow (KCL)
 Robert Ashington Bullen (KCL)
 David Edgar Cartwright (KCL)
 Sir George Deacon (KCL)
 Archibald Thomas John Dollar (KCL)
 William Fyfe (ICL)
 Arthur Holmes (ICL)
 Rosemary Hutton
 Mike Hulme (KCL)
 David Lary (KCL)
 David Linton (KCL)
 Sir Charles Lyell (KCL)
 Halford John Mackinder (LSE)
 Grant Mossop (ICL)
 Charles F. Newcombe
 Sir Dudley Stamp (KCL)
 Sir Gilbert Walker (ICL)
 Sidney Wooldridge (KCL)
 John Anthony Allan (SOAS and KCL)
 John Milne – inventor of the seismometer (KCL)
 James Haward Taylor (KCL)
 Errol White (KCL)

Immunologists
 Anne O'Garra (UCL)
 Noreen Murray – molecular geneticist who helped develop a vaccine against Hepatitis B (KCL)
 Max Theiler – 1951 Nobel laureate who developed a vaccine against yellow fever (KCL)

Mathematicians
 Sir David Cox (BBK & ICL)
 Sir Arthur Lyon Bowley (LSE)
 Simon Donaldson (ICL)
 Patrick du Val (ULIP)
 Louis Mordell (BBK)
 Klaus Roth (UCL & ICL)
 Tom Willmore (KCL)
 David Acheson (KCL)
 Colin Bushnell (KCL)
 Keith Devlin (KCL)
 Graham Everest (KCL)
 Aubrey William Ingleton (KCL)
 Leon Mirsky (KCL)
 Sir Martin Taylor (KCL)
 Henry William Watson (KCL)

Psychologists, Sociologists and Anthropologists
 Havelock Ellis (KCL)
 Dame Uta Frith (KCL)
 Dinesh Bhugra (KCL)
 Akbar S. Ahmed (SOAS)
 Fei Xiaotong (LSE)
 Anthony Giddens (LSE)
 David Hirsh
 Satoshi Kanazawa (LSE)
 Ernest Krausz (1931-2018)
 Bronislaw Malinowski (LSE)
 Karl Mannheim (LSE)
 Z.K. Mathews (LSE)
 Humphry Osmond (KCL)
 Talcott Parsons (LSE)
 J. Philippe Rushton (BBK)
 Jane Stewart
 Arthur Waley (SOAS)
 Ulrike Schmidt (KCL)
 Raymond Cattell (KCL)

Physicians
 Tedros Adhanom (LSHTM), 8th Director-General of the World Health Organization
 Edgar Adrian (QMUL)
 Francis Anstie (KCL)
 Simon Baron-Cohen (KCL)
 Thomas Gregor Brodie (KCL)
 Edgar Crookshank (KCL)
 Henry Hallett Dale (QMUL)
 Ara Darzi, Baron Darzi of Denham (ICL)
 David Blow (ICL)
 Dr Thomas Bond (KCL)
 Michael Foster (UCL)
 Henry Gray (SGUL)
 Thomas Hodgkin (KCL)
 John Hunter (SGUL)
 William Hunter (SGUL)
 Edward Jenner (SGUL)
 Joseph Lister (KCL)
 Peter Mansfield (QMUL)
 J. F. O. Mustapha
 Sir Victor Ewings Negus (KCL)
 Ronald Ross (QMUL)
 Patrick Steptoe (SGUL)
 John Vane (QMUL)
 Robert Winston, Baron Winston (ICL/QMUL)
 Guy Alfred Wyon

Nurses
 Florence Nightingale (KCL)
 Cicely Saunders (KCL)
 Alice Fisher (KCL)
 Lucy Osburn (KCL)
 Emmy Rappe (KCL)
 Henny Tscherning (KCL)
 Theodora Turner (KCL)
 Kofoworola Abeni Pratt (KCL)

Physicists and Astronomers
 Sir Edward Appleton (KCL)
 Charles Barkla (KCL)
 J. D. Bernal (BBK)
 Patrick Blackett, Baron Blackett (ICL)
 Sir William Henry Bragg (UCL)
 Jocelyn Burnell (UCL)
 Louis Essen
 Sir John Ambrose Fleming (UCL)
 Dennis Gabor (ICL)
 Raymond Gosling (KCL)
 Peter Higgs (KCL)
 Charles K. Kao (UCL/ICL)
 Geraint F. Lewis
 Kathleen Lonsdale (RHUL & UCL)
 Robert May, Baron May of Oxford (ICL)
 James Clerk Maxwell (KCL)
 William George Penney (ICL)
 Sir Owen Richardson (KCL)
 Abdus Salam (ICL)
 Keith Shine (ICL)
 Simon Singh (ICL)
 Duncan Steel
 Edward Teller (UCL)
 Sir George Paget Thomson (ICL)
 Edward James Stone (KCL)
 Michael Fisher (KCL)
 Thomas Young (SGUL)
 Andrew Fabian (KCL)
 Claudio Maccone (KCL)
 Marcelo Gleiser (KCL)
 Louis Slotin (KCL)
 John Edwin Midwinter (KCL)

The arts

Novelists, Poets and Playwrights
 Dannie Abse (KCL)
 John Adair (KCL)
 Alfred Ainger (KCL)
 Richard Aldington (UCL)
 Mulk Raj Anand (UCL)
 Alfred Austin
 J. G. Ballard (QMUL)
 Arnold Bennett
 Alain de Botton (KCL)
 Sir Malcolm Bradbury (QMUL)
 Raymond Briggs (UCL)
 Anita Brookner (KCL)
 Robert Browning (UCL)
 G. K. Chesterton (UCL)
 Arthur C. Clarke (KCL)
 Dame Ivy Compton-Burnett (RHUL)
 Bernard Cornwell
 Richmal Crompton (RHUL)
 George Eliot (RHUL)
 T. S. Eliot (BBK)
 Nissim Ezekiel (BBK)
 C. S. Forester (KCL)
 Sir W. S. Gilbert (KCL)
 Ann Granger
 Michael Grothaus (CITY)
 Radclyffe Hall (KCL)
 Thomas Hardy (KCL)
 Susan Hill (KCL)
 Ruth Prawer Jhabvala (QMUL)
 John Keats (KCL)
 Charles Kingsley (KCL)
 Hanif Kureishi (KCL)
 W. Somerset Maugham (KCL)
 Natyaguru Nurul Momen
 Michael Morpurgo (KCL)
 Andrew Motion (RHUL)
 China Miéville (LSE)
 Gladys Mitchell (GCUL)
 John Ruskin (KCL)
 Lao She (SOAS)
 Sir Leslie Stephen (KCL)
 H. G. Wells (ICL & ULIP)
 Virginia Woolf (KCL)
 Samir El-Youssef

Actors, Comedians and TV Stars
 Adewale Akinnuoye-Agbaje (KCL)
 Sir David Attenborough (LSE)
 Rory Bremner (KCL)
 Graham Chapman (QMUL)
 Julian Clary (GCUL)
 Nazia Hassan (GCUL)
 Zoheb Hassan (GCUL)
 Greer Garson (KCL)
 Ricky Gervais (UCL)
 Loyd Grossman (LSE)
 Harry Hill (SGUL)
 Emma Freud (RHUL)
 Cairns James
 Dom Joly (SOAS)
 Boris Karloff
 Robert Kilroy-Silk (LSE)
 Bill O'Reilly (QMUL)
 Devika Rani (RAM)
 Mark Strong (RHUL)
 Bree Turner (KCL)
 Sir Charles Wyndham (KCL)

Directors and Film-Makers
 Herbert Brenon (KCL)
 Derek Jarman (KCL)
 Natyaguru Nurul Momen
 Laura Mulvey (BBK)
 Christopher Nolan (UCL)

Musicians, Composers and Conductors
 Nazia Hassan – singer (KCL)
 Filiz Ali – pianist and musicologist (KCL)
 Peter Asher – musician and record producer (KCL)
 Sir John Barbirolli – conductor (RAM)
 Arnold Bax – composer (RAM)
 Sir Richard Rodney Bennett – composer (RAM)
 Sir Harrison Birtwistle – composer (RAM & KCL)
 Fiona Brice – violinist (KCL)
 Dennis Brain – French hornist (RAM)
 Ming Bridges – singer (KCL)
 David Bruce – composer (KCL)
 Steven Burke – video game music composer and sound designer (KCL)
 Bernard Butler – Suede (QMUL)
 John Cale – The Velvet Underground (GCUL)
 Coldplay members Chris Martin, Will Champion, and Jon Buckland (UCL)
 Sir Clifford Curzon – pianist (RAM)
 John Dankworth – jazz composer (RAM)
 John Deacon – Queen (KCL)
 Suzi Digby – conductor and musician (KCL)
 Pete Doherty – The Libertines (QMUL)
 Adam Dick – Two Crown King (LSE)
 Bruce Dickinson – Iron Maiden (QMUL)
 John Evan – keyboardist for Jethro Tull (KCL)
 Lesley Garrett – soprano (RAM)
 Sir John Eliot Gardiner – conductor (KCL)
 Sir W. S. Gilbert – one half of Gilbert and Sullivan (KCL)
 Evelyn Glennie – percussionist (RAM)
 Dame Myra Hess – pianist (RAM)
 Joe Jackson (RAM)
 Mick Jagger – The Rolling Stones (LSE)
 Alex James – Blur (GCUL)
 Sir Elton John (RAM)
 Linton Kwesi Johnson (GCUL)
 Judge Jules – trance DJ, BBC Radio 1 (LSE)
 Dame Felicity Lott – soprano (RHUL & RAM)
 Brian May – Queen (ICL)
 Brian Molko – Placebo (GCUL)
 Michael Nyman – composer (KCL & RAM)
 Kele Okereke – Bloc Party (KCL)
 Denise Orme – music hall singer (RAM)
 Mat Osman – Suede (LSE)
 Sir Simon Rattle – conductor (RAM)
 Sir Arthur Sullivan – one half of Gilbert and Sullivan (RAM)
 Howard Talbot – composer and conductor (KCL)
 Jody Talbot – composer (RHUL)
 Jeffrey Tate – conductor (KCL)
 Adnan Sami (KCL)
 Gilli Smyth – musician who performed with Gong amongst others (KCL)
 KT Tunstall – singer-songwriter (RHUL)
 Dame Eva Turner – opera singer (RAM)
 Maxim Vengerov – violinist (RAM)
 Sir Henry Wood – conductor (RAM)
 Dido (singer) – singer and songwriter (BBK)
 Yiruma – pianist (KCL)
 Justin Hayward Young – lead singer of The Vaccines (KCL)

Artists
 Pegaret Anthony (KCL)
 Bernd Behr (GCUL)
 Vanessa Bell (KCL)
 Albert Bruce-Joy (KCL)
 Joseph Crawhall III (KCL)
 Ian Davenport (GCUL)
 Grenville Davey (GCUL)
 Tristram Ellis (KCL)
 Peter Henry Emerson (KCL)
 Tracey Emin (GCUL)
 Anya Gallaccio (GCUL)
 Cyril Wiseman Herbert (KCL)
 Damien Hirst (GCUL)
 Gary Hume (GCUL)
 Michael Landy (GCUL)
 Sarah Lucas (GCUL)
 Wendy McMurdo (GCUL)
 Ross McNicol (KCL)
 Steve McQueen (GCUL)
 Cathy de Monchaux (GCUL)
 Ronald Moody (KCL)
 Richard Mosse (KCL)
 Robyn O'Neil (KCL)
 Simon Patterson (GCUL)
 Mary Quant – fashion designer (GCUL)
 Bridget Riley (GCUL)
 Mark Wallinger (GCUL)
 Sophia Wellbeloved (KCL)
 Gillian Wearing (GCUL)
 Catherine Yass (GCUL)

Businesspeople
 Lim Kok Thay — Malaysia Billionaire, Chairman & CEO of Genting Group
 Rakesh Aggarwal (KCL)
 Sir David Arculus – chairman of the Board O2 (LBS)
 Delphine Arnault – billionaire French businesswoman (LSE)
 Walter Owen Bentley – founder of Bentley Motors (KCL)
 Kumar Mangalam Birla – Chairman of Aditya Birla Group (LBS)
 Michael Cowpland – founder of Corel (ICL)
 Isabel dos Santos – Africa's richest woman and its first female billionaire (KCL)
 Clara Furse – Chief Executive of the London Stock Exchange (LSE)
 Calouste Gulbenkian – Armenian oil magnate (KCL)
 Sir Richard Greenbury – former chairman and Chief Executive of Marks & Spencer (LBS)
 Stelios Haji-Ioannou – founder of EasyGroup (LSE)
 Klaus Heymann – entrepreneur & founder of Naxos Records (KCL)
 Omar Ishrak – Chairman & CEO of Medtronic (KCL)
 Huw Jenkins – CEO of UBS Investment Bank (LBS)
 Sir Ronald Norman (KCL)
 Sir Edward Packard (KCL)
 Moez Kassam – Founder of Anson Group (LBS)
 Spiro Latsis – billionaire (LSE)
 Charles Lee – Former chairman of the Hong Kong Stock Exchange (LSE)
 Sir Deryck Maughan – CEO and Chairman of Salomon Brothers (KCL)
 Eric Nicoli – CEO of EMI (KCL)
 Jorma Ollila – Former CEO of Nokia (LSE)
 Gary Tanaka – founder of Amerindo(ICL)
 David E. Potter – founder and Chairman of Psion, Chairman of Symbian (ICL)
 Danny Lui – founder of Lenovo (ICL)
 Sir Ralph Robins (CEO of Rolls-Royce) (ICL)
 Sir Alliott Verdon Roe (KCL)
 Chew Choon Seng – CEO of Singapore Airlines (ICL)
 David Rockefeller – American billionaire and business tycoon (LSE)
 Iain Conn – Group Managing Director of BP (ICL)
 Tim Pryce – CEO of Terra Firma Capital Partners (KCL)
 David Sullivan – billionaire businessman; media magnate, West Ham United football club owner (QMUL)
 Colin Dyer – CEO of Jones Lang LaSalle (ICL)
 Maurice Saatchi – founder of Saatchi and Saatchi (LSE)
 Winston Wong – businessman (ICL)
 Sir Richard Sykes – chairman of GlaxoSmithKline (KCL)
 Keith Duckworth – founder of Cosworth Engineering (ICL)
 Michael Birch – founder of Bebo (ICL)
 Koh Boon Hwee – Chairman of DBS Bank, Singapore(ICL)
 George Soros – financial speculator and philanthropist (LSE)
 Stephen Bernard Streater – founder of Eidos (KCL)
 Sir David Tang – businessman and founder of Shanghai Tang fashion chain (KCL)
 Tony Wheeler – founder of Lonely Planet (LBS)
 Naveen Selvadurai – co-founder of Foursquare (KCL)

Economists
 George Akerlof (LSE)
 Sir Roy Allen (LSE)
 Eurfyl ap Gwilym (KCL)
 Kenneth Binmore (ICL)
 Ronald Coase (ULIP & LSE)
 William Cunningham (KCL)
 Robert F. Engle III (LSE)
 Fred Harrison
 Friedrich von Hayek (LSE)
 James Heckman (UCL)
 Sir John Hicks (LSE)
 Leonid Hurwicz (LSE)
 William Stanley Jevons (UCL)
 Richard Jones (KCL)
 Charles Kennedy (ICL)
 Israel Kirzner (ULIP)
 Mervyn King (LSE)
 Paul Krugman (LSE)
 Sir Arthur Lewis (LSE)
 James Meade (LSE)
 Merton Miller (LSE)
 Robert Mundell (LSE)
 Mark Pennington (LSE & KCL)
 Christopher Pissarides (LSE)
 Lionel Robbins (LSE)
 Amartya Sen (LSE)
 Nicholas Stern (LSE)
 Sidney Webb, 1st Baron Passfield (BBK & KCL)
 Janet Yellen (LSE)

Historians
 Ali Ansari (KCL)
 Ram Sharan Sharma eminent Historian of Ancient India
 Sir Raymond Beazley (KCL)
 Antony Beevor (BBK)
 Matthew Bennett (KCL)
 Brian Bond (KCL)
 Asa Briggs, Baron Briggs (ULIP)
 Sir William Laird Clowes (KCL)
 Sebastian Cox (KCL)
 Paul Davis (KCL)
 Henri Dorra (KCL)
 Richard J. Evans (BBK)
 Orlando Figes (BBK)
 Katherine Elizabeth Fleming (KCL)
 Ian Gooderson (KCL)
 Andrew Gordon (KCL)
 Judith Green (KCL)
 Mark Grimsley (KCL)
 Eric Grove (KCL)
 Richard Grunberger (KCL)
 D. G. E. Hall (KCL)
 Christopher Harper-Bill (KCL)
 Eric Hobsbawm (BBK)
 David Irving (ICL)
 Robert Knecht (KCL)
 Amélie Kuhrt (KCL)
 Andrew Lambert (KCL)
 Bernard Lewis (SOAS)
 Desmond Morton (LSE)
 Percy Newberry (KCL)
 Peter Paret (KCL)
 Sir Nikolaus Pevsner (BBK)
 Ben Pimlott (BBK)
 David Rohl (UCL)
 Philip Sabin (KCL)
 George Albert Wells (BBK)
 Conrad Russell (UCL)
 David Cannadine (UL)
 Arnaldo Momigliano (UCL)
 Gary Sheffield (KCL)
 Anne Somerset (KCL)
 Geoffrey Till (KCL)
 Colin White (KCL)
 Donald Wiseman (KCL)

Journalists
 Anita Anand (KCL)
 Ruaridh Arrow (KCL)
 Martin Bashir (KCL)
 Cyril Kenneth Bird (KCL)
 Lisa Brennan-Jobs (KCL)
 Sana Bucha (KCL)
 Daniel Ford (KCL)
 Edward Greenspon (LSE)
 Sydney Jacobson, Baron Jacobson (KCL)
 Ellie Harrison (KCL)
 Charles Franklin Hildebrand
 Bernard Levin (LSE)
 Michael Lewis (LSE)
 Sophie Long (KCL)
 Jonathan Maitland (KCL)
 Ira Mathur (KCL)
 Hargreaves Parkinson (KCL)
 Trevor Phillips (ICL)
 Chapman Pincher (KCL)
 Richard Sambrook (BBK)
 Laurie Taylor (BBK)
 Xiao Qian (SOAS)
 Claire Rayner (KCL)
 Tom Rogan (KCL)
 Roger Royle (KCL)
 John Sandes (KCL)
 Nicholas Stuart (KCL)

Judges and lawyers
 Dixon Kwame Afreh, Justice of the Supreme Court of Ghana (2002–2003)
 Christopher Weeramantry, Judge and vice-president of the International Court of Justice (ULIP)
 Bola Ajibola, Judge of the International Court of Justice (ULIP)
 William Brett, 1st Viscount Esher - Master of the Rolls (KCL).
 Philippe Couvreur – Registrar at the International Court of Justice (KCL)
 Abdul Koroma – Judge of the International Court of Justice (KCL)
 Patrick Lipton Robinson – Judge of the International Court of Justice (KCL)
 Meir Shamgar – President/Chief Justice of the Israel Supreme Court (ULIP)
 Michael Ashikodi Agbamuche – Nigerian Attorney General (KCL)
 Salahuddin Ahmad – Attorney General of Bangladesh (LSE)
 Edward Williams, Judge of the Supreme Court of Queensland, Australia (ULIP)
 Syed Ishtiaq Ahmed – former Attorney General of Bangladesh (LSE)
 Dame Geraldine Andrews (KCL)
 Sir Robin Auld – Lord Justice of Appeal (KCL)
 Sir Horace Avory – Judge and criminal lawyer (KCL)
 Sir Harry Dias Bandaranaike – Chief Justice of the Supreme Court of Ceylon (KCL)
 Sir Harold Bollers – Chief Justice of Guyana (KCL)
 Kofi Adumua Bossman – Justice of the Supreme Court of Ghana (KCL)
 Sir Mackenzie Chalmers (KCL)
 Francis Chang-Sam – Seychellois Attorney General (KCL)
 Dame Bobbie Cheema-Grubb – High Court Judge (KCL)
 Sir Fielding Clarke – Chief Justice of Fiji, Hong Kong and Jamaica (KCL)
 Segun Toyin Dawodu – physician, entrepreneur, journalist, attorney and founder Dawodu.com (KCL/ULIP)
 Edmund Davies, Baron Edmund-Davies – Lord Justice of Appeal and Law Lord (KCL)
 Albert Venn Dicey – English jurist (ICL)
 Sir David Foskett – High Court judge (KCL)
 Sir Cyril Fountain – Chief Justice of The Bahamas (KCL)
 Brian Hayes - South Australian lawyer and former National Chairman of the Australia India Business Council.
 Robert John Hayfron-Benjamin – Chief Justice of Botswana (1977–1981)
 Chukwunweike Idigbe – Justice of the Supreme Court of Nigeria (KCL)
 K. C. Kamalasabayson – Sri Lankan Attorney General (KCL)
 Neil Kaplan – Judge and arbitrator (KCL)
 Gilbert Walter King – Judge of the British Supreme Court for China
 Frances Kirkham – Judge(KCL)
 Sir Leonard Knowles – Chief Justice of The Bahamas (KCL)
 Sir George Jessel – English jurist (UCL)
 Mustafa Kamal – former Chief Justice of Bangladesh (LSE)
 Anthony Kennedy – American Supreme Court justice (LSE)
 Nii Ashie Kotey – A Ghanaian academic and active justice of the Supreme Court of Ghana (2018–)
 Wayne Martin – former Chief Justice of Western Australia (KCL)
 Trevor Moniz – Bermudan Attorney General (KCL)
 Thomas Mesereau – American Defence Attorney (LSE)
 Janine Pritchard – Justice of the Supreme Court of Western Australia.
 Shabtai Rosenne – International Law professor
 Sir David Penry-Davey – High Court judge (KCL)
 Choor Singh, Judge of the Supreme Court of Singapore (ULIP)
 Babatunji Olowofoyeku, Attorney General of Western Region, Nigeria (ULIP)
 Ilana Rovner – Judge (KCL)
 Jenny Rowe – Chief Executive of the Supreme Court of the United Kingdom (KCL)
 J. Sarkodee-Addo – Chief Justice of Ghana (KCL)
 Kobina Sekyi – Ghanaian lawyer, poet and politician
 Frederic N. Smalkin, former Chief Judge of the United States District Court for the District of Maryland (ULIP)
 John Taylor – Chief Justice of Lagos (KCL)
 Sir Skinner Turner – Chief Judge of the British Supreme Court for China
 William Bedford Van Lare – Ghanaian jurist and diplomat, former justice of the Supreme Court of Ghana (UCL)
 Thomas Webb – Judge (KCL)
 Sir Michael Whitley – Singaporean Attorney General (KCL)

Philosophers
 A. J. Ayer (UCL)
 William Warren Bartley (LSE)
 Helen Beebee (KCL)
 Nick Bostrom (LSE)
 Harry Brighouse (KCL)
 Elizabeth Burns (KCL)
 Nancy Cartwright (LSE)
 Brian Davies (KCL)
 Daniel Dennett (LSE)
 Paul Feyerabend (LSE)
 Raimond Gaita (KCL)
 Ernest Gellner (LSE)
 Jonathan Glover (KCL)
 John Gray (LSE)
 A. C. Grayling (BBK)
 C. E. M. Joad (BBK)
 Imre Lakatos (LSE)
 Alasdair MacIntyre (QMUL)
 David Miller (LSE)
 Alan Musgrave (LSE)
 Michael Oakeshott (LSE)
 Sir Karl Popper (LSE)
 Stathis Psillos (KCL)
 John Ralston Saul (KCL)
 Simon Saunders (KCL)
 Syed Muhammad Naquib al-Attas (SOAS)
 Bertrand Russell (LSE)
 Mark Sainsbury (KCL)
 Roger Scruton (BBK)
 Jeremy Shearmur (LSE)
 Elliott Sober (LSE)
 Nicla Vassallo (KCL)
 Sir Ralph Wedgwood, 4th Baronet (KCL)

Sportspersons
 Jo Ankier athlete (KCL)
 Dina Asher-Smith – Olympic winning athlete (KCL)
 Louis Attrill – Olympic gold medallist, rowing (ICL)
 Roger Bannister – first to run the four-minute mile (ICL)
 Paul Bennett – Olympic gold medal-winning rower (KCL)
 Simon Dennis – Olympic gold medallist, rowing (ICL)
 Harry Gem – inventor of lawn tennis (KCL)
 Hugh Lindsay – English amateur footballer who played for Southampton and appeared in the 1960 Summer Olympics
 Katherine Grainger – Olympic gold medalist, rowing (KCL)
 Frances Houghton – Olympic medal-winning rower (KCL)
 Zoe Lee – Olympic medal-winning rower (KCL)
 Kieran West – Olympic gold medallist, rowing (KCL)
 Annabel Vernon – Olympic medal-winning rower (KCL)
 Thomas Hollingdale – Welsh international rugby player (KCL)
 Adam Khan – racing driver (KCL)
 Corinna Lawrence – fencer (KCL)
 Gary Lineker – England footballer and television pundit (KCL)
 Edward Pegge – Welsh international rugby player (KCL)
 Leigh Richmond Roose – Welsh international footballer (KCL)
 Chris Sheasby – England rugby player (KCL)

Others
 Abdalla Uba Adamu, professor, media scholar, vice chancellor, National Open University of Nigeria
 Thomas Armitage – founder of the RNIB (KCL)
 James Barrett (academic) – academic (KCL)
 Thomas John Barnardo – philanthropist (QMUL)
 Hedley Bull – International Relations academic (LSE)
 Urvashi Butalia – Indian feminist writer, publisher, and activist
 Alex Comfort – writer of "The Joy of Sex" (UCL)
 Sir William Coxen, 1st Baronet – Lord Mayor of London (KCL)
 Satyabrata Rai Chowdhuri – International Relations academic (LSE), (ICwS)
 Quentin Crisp – writer, actor and raconteur (KCL)
 James Cuno – director of the Courtauld Institute of Art (2003-2004)
 Sir Christopher Geidt – Private Secretary to Queen Elizabeth II (KCL)
 Harry Golombek – chess grandmaster (KCL)
 Devendra Prasad Gupta – academic (KCL)
 Michael Halliday – linguist
 Harold Jenkins – Shakespeare scholar
 Reginald Johnston – teacher of Puyi (SOAS)
 Sir Ivison Macadam – first President of NUS and Director-General of Chatham House  (KCL)
 David Livingstone – explorer (ICL)
 Ram Charan Mehrotra - Vice Chancellor of the University of Delhi and University of Allahabad
 Linda Norgrove – kidnapped by the Taliban in Afghanistan, and killed in rescue effort
 Ilich Ramírez Sánchez – criminal and terrorist (LSE)
 José Graziano da Silva – agronomist, Director General of the Food and Agriculture Organization (ILAS)
 Nancy Rothwell – academic (KCL)
 Sir Francis Wyatt Truscott – Lord Mayor of London (KCL)
 Marianne Winder – linguist, author, Buddhist and Librarian at the Wellcome Library
 Josh Carrott – Youtuber
 Arthur Christopher Watson – British High Commissioner to Brunei

Honorary degrees
The University of London presented its first honorary degrees in June 1903. This accolade has been bestowed on several members of British royal family and a wide range of distinguished individuals from both the academic and non-academic worlds. Honorary degrees are approved by the Collegiate Council, part of the university's governance structure.
 George V (Hon. 1903), King of the United Kingdom and the British Dominions and Emperor of India
 Edward VIII (Hon. M.Com. 1921, D.Sc. 1921), King of the United Kingdom and the British Dominions and Emperor of India
 Queen Elizabeth The Queen Mother (Hon. D.Litt. 1937), Queen consort of the United Kingdom and the British Dominions
 Princess Alice, Countess of Athlone (1933), member of the British royal family
 Queen Elizabeth II (Hon. BMus, Hon. LLD), Queen of the United Kingdom and the other Commonwealth realms
 Prince Philip, Duke of Edinburgh (Hon. LLD) Consort of the British monarch
 Princess Margaret (Hon. D.Mus. 1957), Member of British royal family
 Albert Einstein (1936), Theoretical physicist and Recipient of Nobel Prize in Physics in 1921
 René Cassin (1969), Recipient of Nobel Peace Prize in 1968
 Lars Ahlfors (1978), Finnish mathematician Recipient of Fields Medal in 1936.
 Franklin D. Roosevelt (1941; conferred in 1945), 32nd President of the United States
 Winston Churchill (Hon. LLD 1948), Prime Minister of the United Kingdom
 Stanley Baldwin (1933), Prime Minister of the United Kingdom
 Helena Kennedy (2015), Principal of Mansfield College, Oxford
 John Beddington (2015), UK Government Chief Scientific Adviser
 Rolph Payet (Hon. D.Sc. 2016), United Nations Executive Secretary for the Basel, Rotterdam and Stockholm Convention
 Cosmo Gordon Lang (1933), Archbishop of Canterbury (1928–1942)
 Eliza Manningham-Buller (2019), Director General of MI5 (2002 to 2007)
 Jack Higgins, British writer
 David Cannadine (Hon. D.Litt. 2017), President of the British Academy
 Sue Black (Hon. D.Sc. 2018), Pro Vice-Chancellor at Lancaster University

References

Notes

External links
 University of London student lists

London
 
People